The GE U23B was a 2,250 horsepower diesel-electric locomotive built by GE Transportation from 1968 to 1977. It was one of the most successful models of the Universal Series, with 481 units built, including 16 exported to Peru. The U23B was replaced by the B23-7.

History 
Featuring a 12 cylinder FDL engine, the U23B was a derivative of the U30B with a lower horsepower rating, producing 2,250 hp compared to the U30B's 3,000 hp.

A variant with 6 axles instead of 4 was produced, known as the U23C.

Original owners

Surviving locomotives

Not many U23Bs still exist, but a few shortline and regional railroads still use them in everyday service. The Georgia Central Railway was one of the last U23B holdouts, rostering almost all of the remaining ex Southern Railway (U.S.) high short hood U23Bs. The Georgia Central as of July 2015 has all of its U23Bs off of the roster with the 3965 going to the Southern Appalachia Railway Museum in Oak Ridge, TN. Another U23B, CSX 9553, former L&N 2817, is preserved at the museum and is operable.

The Huntsville and Madison County Railroad Authority in Huntsville, AL, operates one of the last U23B's used in daily freight service, as of April 2020. HMCR 9554 was originally built in late 1974 as L&N 2800. The last U23B built, originally Conrail 2798, and more recently Providence and Worcester 2203, is in regular excursion service at the Naugatuck Railroad, operated by the Railroad Museum of New England in Thomaston, Connecticut.

Western Rail Inc in Airway Heights, WA currently has a U23B that is leased out to other railroads. It is numbered NIWX 2204 and is a Northern Illinois and Wisconsin locomotive. RJ Corman operates at least one, Road Number 2300, after acquiring the Lehigh Railway short line in Northeast Pennsylvania.

References

External links
 
 Sarberenyi, Robert. GE U23B Original Owners

U23B
B-B locomotives
Diesel-electric locomotives of the United States
Railway locomotives introduced in 1968
Standard gauge locomotives of the United States
Standard gauge locomotives of Mexico